Stefano Capani (died 1481) was a Roman Catholic prelate who served as Bishop of Lavello (1463–1481).

Biography
On 13 June 1463, Stefano Capani  was appointed by Pope Pius II as Bishop of Lavello.
He served as Bishop of Lavello until his death in 1481.

See also
Catholic Church in Italy

References

External links and additional sources
 (Chronology of Bishops) 
 (Chronology of Bishops) 

15th-century Italian Roman Catholic bishops
1481 deaths
Bishops appointed by Pope Pius II